Abarsal was a city-state of Mesopotamia in the area of the Euphrates. Very litte is known of the history of the town and the site is unidentified at the moment. It could be the city of Aburru mentioned in various texts of the tablets of Mari, which was located south of Emar to Qalat Gabir.  A second theory says that could be Apishal.

About 2420 BC, King Iblul-Il was called King of Mari Abarsal. Vizier of Ebla Ibrium (24th-century BC) campaigned against the city of Abarsal during the time of vizier Arrukum.

References

Ancient cities of the Middle East
Mesopotamia